Dharma is a 2004 Indian Kannada-language film written and directed by K. V. Chandrakanth, produced by M. G. Ramamurthy under Vasushree Productions, starring Darshan, Sindhu Menon and Manisha. The film has musical score by Hamsalekha. The film was released on 5 March 2004.

Cast

Production 
A new heroine Jennifer credited as Monisha is signed in to play the second heroine. She had worked in a few Tamil films under the pseudonym of Nanditha. K. V. Chandrakanth who worked as an assistant to P. Vasu makes his directional debut. Hamsalekha will score the soundtrack while cinematography is handled by Sundarnath Suvarna. Jai Jagadish, Doddanna, Rangayana Raghu, Harish Rai, Bhagath Bhaagavathar and Ramesh Pandith portray other characters. The film was shot in Mysore, Ooty, Bangalore and Goa.

Themes 
According to writer-director K. V. Chandrakanth, the central character Dharma enacted by Darshan Thoogudeep is an uncultured rowdy. The film marks his transition from a thug to a poet thus proving that the pen is mightier than a sword. Also the character of Dharma and his transition is similar to the life of Valmiki and his evolution from a barbarian to a poet.

Music 
 "Hrudaya Nin Impada" by Divya and Chethan 
 "Kavya Amrutha" by S. P. Balasubrahmanyam
 "Nam Hero Barthan" by Hemanth Kumar
 "Meghashyama Baa" by Rajesh Krishnan and Nanditha
 "Readina" by Hemanth
 "Shocku Shocku" by Malgudi Subha

References

External links 
Deccan Herald review

2004 films
Indian action films
2004 action films
2000s Kannada-language films